The Wright Idea is a 1928 American silent comedy film directed by Charles Hines and starring Johnny Hines, Louise Lorraine and Edmund Breese.

Cast
 Johnny Hines as Johnny Wright
 Louise Lorraine as Helen
 Edmund Breese as Mr. Filbert
 Walter James as Capt. Sandy
 Fred Kelsey as M.T. Flatt
 Henry A. Barrows as 	Mr. Smoot 
 Henry Hebert as 	Mr. Stein
 Charles Giblyn as Mr. Carter
 Jack McHugh as Spec
 J. Barney Sherry as 	O.J. Gude
 Charles K. Gerrard as Mr. Roberts 
 Betty Westmore as 	Betty 
 Blanche Craig as Mrs. O'Toole
 Richard Maitland as Mr. Saunders

References

Bibliography
 Connelly, Robert B. The Silents: Silent Feature Films, 1910–36, Volume 40, Issue 2. December Press, 1998.
 Munden, Kenneth White. The American Film Institute Catalog of Motion Pictures Produced in the United States, Part 1. University of California Press, 1997.

External links
 

1928 films
1928 comedy films
1920s English-language films
American silent feature films
Silent American comedy films
Films directed by Charles Hines
American black-and-white films
1920s American films